Savio Hon Tai-fai SDB (born 21 October 1950) is a Roman Catholic archbishop who works in the diplomatic service of the Holy See. He served as secretary of the Congregation for the Evangelization of Peoples from 2010 to 2017. Before that he was professor of theology at the Holy Spirit Seminary of Hong Kong.

Biography 
Hon was born in Hong Kong. After studying at a Salesian school, he made his first religious profession on 15 August 1969. He made perpetual vows on 15 August 1975 and was ordained a priest in Hong Kong on 17 July 1982. He received his B.A. in philosophy from the University of London and a doctorate in theology at Rome's Pontifical Salesian University.

Hon was a visiting professor at various seminaries in China and as professor of theology at the seminary of Hong Kong. His research has appeared in a variety of journals, especially those devoted to theology. He was responsible for the translation of the Catechism of the Catholic Church into Chinese. He belongs to the Salesian Province of China which encompasses mainland China, Hong Kong, Macau, and Taiwan.

Hon became a member of the Pontifical Academy of Theology in 1999. He was named to a five-year term as a member of the International Theological Commission in 2004 and his appointment was renewed in 2009.

On 23 December 2010, Pope Benedict XVI appointed him Titular Archbishop of Sila and secretary of the Congregation for the Evangelization of Peoples. Hon Tai Fai had known the pope for many years, since Benedict was president of the International Theological Commission during most of Hon's tenure on the commission.

Hon was consecrated in Rome on 5 February 2011 by Pope Benedict, with Cardinals Angelo Sodano and Tarcisio Bertone as co-consecrators. He said of his consecration: "I could feel an airstream when the pope laid his hands with strength on my head".

In March 2011, Hon said the planned ordination of priests by the Chinese Patriotic Catholic Association meant "division ... causes great pain to the entire body ... [the] whole body is scarred and bleeding", because no bishop can be validly appointed without a papal mandate. He added that those who have resisted the will of the party, such as Monsignor Li Lianghui (Cangzhou, Hebei) are now in isolation, forced to undergo political re-education classes. He said that Chinese priests and bishops must show "some backbone" and resist government pressure out of love for Church unity and the memory of the many heroic witnesses to the faith of the past decades. Hon has sought without success to win the release from prison of two imprisoned bishops, Su Zhi-Min of Baoding and Cosma Shi Enxiang of Yixian.

In July 2011, Archbishop Hon, while addressing hundreds of delegates during the 17th plenary assembly of Association of Member Episcopal Conferences in Eastern Africa (AMECEA) in Nairobi, stressed the ever-increasing role of the lay faithful in evangelization. He said "Given that between 70%-80% of our church collaborators are women, AMECEA should make the effort to increase room for them in decision making processes". He warned against the culture of death especially abortion and other "ideological poisons from abroad", which are leading to the erosion of certain African values whose sense of family the church supports. "AMECEA as a community of Christians has been useful in promoting the family beyond the limits of blood relationship and tribal allegiance", he said, in reference to the many inter-ethnic conflicts engulfing the region.

On 7 March 2012 he was appointed a member of the Pontifical Committee for the International Euchrastic Congresses. On 12 June 2012, he was appointed a member of the Pontifical Council for Promoting Christian Unity.

Archbishop Hon served as the Apostolic Administrator of the Archdiocese of Agana, Guam, from 6 June 2016 until 31 October 2016 when Michael J. Byrnes was appointed Coadjutor Archbishop of the archdiocese.

On 28 September 2017, Pope Francis named him Apostolic Nuncio to Greece, his first position in the diplomatic service.

On 24 October 2022, Pope Francis named him Apostolic Nuncio to Malta.

See also
 List of heads of the diplomatic missions of the Holy See

References 

1950 births
21st-century Roman Catholic titular archbishops
Alumni of the University of London
Apostolic Nuncios to Greece
Chinese Roman Catholic bishops
Hong Kong chaplains
Hong Kong Roman Catholic bishops
Living people
Salesian bishops
Salesian Pontifical University alumni
Apostolic Nuncios to Malta